The War of Deposition against King Hans was a conflict in which Swedish separatists under the leadership of the Swedish regent Sten Sture the Elder rebelled against the newly elected king of the Kalmar Union, Hans. 

On 1 January 1501, an assembly of Swedish nobles declared the deposition of the king of the Kalmar Union, Hans, from the Swedish throne. King Hans had been elected King of Sweden four years prior, but there was great dislike of his rule and the Danish officials placed to rule in the king's stead. When the Swedish rebel army took Örebro in August 1501, the king left for Denmark to gather troops and left his queen, Christina of Saxony, in possession of Stockholm. The king was declared deposed and Sten Sture the Elder proclaimed regent. In October, Stockholm was taken, and in May 1502, queen Christina surrendered Stockholm Castle. In the summer of 1502, the rebels took Finland, and in the spring of 1503, Kalmar was taken.

The  conflict resulted in the deposition of Hans as King of Sweden, and was a part of the bigger Dano-Swedish War (1501–12).

References

 Sundberg, Ulf (2002). Medeltidens svenska krig (2. uppl.). Stockholm: Hjalmarson & Högberg. sid. 381-385. Libris 8666286. 

1501 in Sweden
1501 in Denmark
Conflicts in 1501
Conflicts in 1502
Conflicts in 1503
16th-century rebellions
Denmark–Sweden relations
Wars involving Denmark
Wars involving Sweden
Rebellions in Sweden